Harold Thomas Herbert (June 17, 1922 – July 25, 2003) was a British-born Canadian politician. He introduced the Private Member's Bill in 1982 which amended the Holidays Act to change the name of Canada's national holiday from "Dominion Day" to "Canada Day".

Born in London, England, he joined the Royal Air Force in 1940 and took flight training in Canada in 1941. During the World War II, he flew Spitfires on high-altitude photo-reconnaissance trips and was awarded a Distinguished Flying Cross. After the war, he studied engineering in Scotland and moved to Canada in 1948. He eventually became a partner with a Montreal construction firm.

He was elected to the House of Commons of Canada in the 1972 federal election representing the riding of Vaudreuil. A Liberal, he was re-elected in 1974, 1979, and 1980. He was defeated in 1984. In 1978, he was the Parliamentary Secretary to the Minister of State for Urban Affairs and Parliamentary Secretary to the Minister of Public Works. In 1984, he was the Deputy Chair of Committees of the Whole.

Electoral record

References

External links
 

1922 births
2003 deaths
British emigrants to Canada
Liberal Party of Canada MPs
Members of the House of Commons of Canada from Quebec